HMS Vigorous was a V-class submarine of the Royal Navy (RN). Pennant number P74.

The boat was laid down by Vickers-Armstrong at Barrow-in-Furness on 14 December 1942. She was launched on 15 October 1943, and commissioned into the RN on 13 January 1944.

The submarine operated during the late stages of World War II. On 26 September 1944, HMS Vigorous (Lt. J.C. Ogle, DSC, RN) torpedoed and sank the German merchant Salomea (751 BRT, former Greek Evangelos Nomikos) off Kassandra, Greece.

The submarine was decommissioned after the war and was broken up for scrap at Stockton-on-Tees, 23 December 1949.

References
 
 

 

British V-class submarines
Ships built in Barrow-in-Furness
1943 ships